The Don Mueang–Suvarnabhumi–U-Tapao high-speed railway, officially known as the High-Speed Rail Linking Three Airports Project is the second high-speed rail line project in Thailand, being due to open in 2029 between Don Mueang International Airport, Suvarnabhumi Airport and U-Tapao International Airport. It will be operated by Asia Era One Company Limited, a special-purpose vehicles by the consortium of Charoen Pokphand Group Company, Limited (CP) and partners Ch. Karnchang PLC. (CK), Bangkok Expressway and Metro PLC. (BEM), Italian-Thai Development PLC. (ITD) and China Railway Construction Corporation Limited (CRCC).

This project is part of the Eastern Economic Corridor of Thailand.

History

A HSR line to the eastern seaboard was first proposed in 1996 but there was no progress for over a decade. In 2009, the government requested the Office of Transport and Traffic Policy and Planning (OTP) to create a plan for new HSR network in Thailand that included an eastern HSR line to Rayong. The route was finalised before the 2011 election with the promise to begin construction the next year if the government was re-elected, but they lost the election. After the 2011 election, the new government reviewed all HSR plans and the SRT stated that the line would be tendered in early-2014. After the May 2014 coup there were further delays while the military government reviewed all HSR lines, initially deferring all projects. In early-2016, the government agreed to proceed with the eastern HSR route and suggested that it could be extended to Don Mueang International Airport beyond the terminus at Bang Sue Intercity Terminal thus providing a link with three airports. Extending the line would provide a link between Don Mueang Airport, Suvarnabhumi Airport, and U-Tapao International Airport in Ban Chang District.

During 2017, OTP and the Ministry of Transport in consultation with the SRT agreed that by extending the line to terminate at Don Mueang it would effectively include the long delayed extension of the Airport Rail Link (Bangkok) from Makkasan Station to Don Mueang Airport as part of the project. The Eastern Economic Corridor Office (EEC Office) in October 2017 finalised previous OTP plans to build the 10 station Eastern HSR line linking Don Mueang airport, Bang Sue, Makkasan, Suvarnabhumi Airport, Chonburi, Si Racha, Pattaya, U-Tapao Airport, and Rayong. In early-2018, the section to Rayong was excluded due to environmental and safety concerns and it was decided that the line would terminate at U-Tapao Airport.

The SRT stated that the first tenders for the Eastern HSR line are expected to be tendered by May 2018 with a four month auction period before the contract is awarded. The cost of the project was estimated to be over 200 billion baht, of which the Thai Government would fund 123 billion baht and the private sector estimated to contribute 90 billion baht.

Impact
Trains on the route are projected to have a speed of 250 kilometres per hour over the 220 km distance when it opens. According to Kanit Sangsubhan, Secretary-General of the Eastern Economic Corridor (EEC) Office, tourist numbers will increase by eight percent due to the train. "It will handle 15 million passengers in the next five years, 30 million passengers in the next 15 years and 60 million passengers in the next 20 years," Mr Kanit said. Without specifying a time frame, he said the route will generate a return of 700 billion baht. It is expected to create 19,000 new jobs in the EEC according to the Employers Confederation of Thai Trade and Industry.

Construction contracts and progress
Two rival consortia vied for the airport link contract. The Charoen Pokphand (CP) Group-led consortium consisting of Italian-Thai Development, China Railway Construction Corporation Ltd, CH. Karnchang, and Bangkok Expressway and Metro, won the project with a 224 billion baht bid in December 2018. Their winning bid is valid until 8 November 2019. Until 16 October 2019, the consortium had refused to sign the contract, citing land expropriation and eviction problems and the consortium's request that the government share the risk in the project. Negotiations were further complicated by the resignation of the entire board of the State Railway. On 16 October 2019, news reports announced that the CP consortium intends to sign the rail deal on 25 October. The project was eventually approved in October 2019 as a public private partnership between the Thai government and Charoen Pokphand/China Railway Construction Corporation. The assets will revert to state ownership after 50 years.

Service

Local connections

Extension 

A future phase 2 extension could extend as far as Trat however a 2020 feasibility study raised questions about its value.

References

Rail transport in Thailand
High-speed rail in Thailand